The 1982 Monte Carlo Open (also known as the Jacomo Monte Carlo Open for sponsorship reasons) was a men's tennis tournament played on outdoor clay courts at the Monte Carlo Country Club in Roquebrune-Cap-Martin, France that was part of the 1982 Volvo Grand Prix circuit. It was the 76th edition of the tournament and was held from 5 April through 11 April 1982. Second-seeded Guillermo Vilas won the singles title.

Finals

Singles

 Guillermo Vilas defeated  Ivan Lendl, 6–1, 7–6, 6–3
 It was Vilas' 4th singles title of the year and the 56th of his career.

Doubles

 Peter McNamara /  Paul McNamee defeated  Mark Edmondson /  Sherwood Stewart, 6–7, 7–6, 6–3

References

External links
 
 ITF tournament edition details

Monte Carlo Open
Monte-Carlo Masters
1982 in Monégasque sport
Monte